Mariae Wiegenlied (Mary's lullaby) is a German Christmas song for solo voice and piano, with music by Max Reger and words by . It was originally published in 1912.

References

1912 songs
Christmas songs
German songs
Marian hymns
Compositions by Max Reger